Anatoly Ernestovich Sharpenak (1895 in Moscow, Russia – 1969 in Moscow, Soviet Union) was a Russian Empire and Soviet biochemist,  Doctor of Medical Sciences, Professor. Author of one of the dental caries theories named after him.

Biography
He graduated from a good private school and then university. 

During the Russian Civil War he served as a doctor on a hospital train.

In 1920 he worked under the direction of ) in the newly created Biochemical Institute.

In 1939 he organized a biochemical department at the Moscow Stomatological Institute (now Moscow State University of Medicine and Dentistry). He was the chair of this department until 1969.

While heading the department at the Moscow Stomatological Institute, he also held the following positions:
 From 1945 to 1969, Head of the Laboratory of Protein Metabolism Institute of Nutrition, Russian Academy of Medical Sciences (now the Laboratory of metabolism and energy of the Federal government agency "Scientific Research Institute of Nutrition, Russian Academy of Medical Sciences. 
 From 1959 to 1969, Head of the Biochemical Laboratory at the City Clinical Hospital named after S.P. Botkin (Botkin Hospital).

A. E. Sharpenak died in January 1969 of complications from influenza. He was buried at the Preobrazhenskoye Cemetery in Moscow.

Scientific activities
One of the first works of the Biochemical Institute, under the leadership of A.N. Bach in 1920, was the creation of a new method for determination of enzyme levels. The lack of accurate microscopic methods that require minimal amounts of blood at the time made it impossible to explore the work of enzymes in normal and pathological conditions  systematically. A method that was devised and later received the name of the Bach-Zubkova method allowed work with one mm3 of blood (one drop of blood, approximately the size of a small pin head). At the request of the Institute ten special calorimeters were built, which were provided to hospitals for systematic studies. 

A.E. Sharpenak pointed out that the diet should take into account not only the total protein content, but also the content of individual amino acids. The effect of protein quality of the diet on the body depends not only on the absolute content of individual amino acids in the diet, but also on the balance between them.

He authored more than 150 scientific papers, including university textbooks on organic and biological chemistry. He supervised 11 Ph.D. theses.

Sharpenak’s theory of dental caries
As head of the Department of Biochemistry at Moscow Stomatological Institute, Professor A.E. Sharpenak tackled one of the major problems of dentistry, namely, the etiology and pathogenesis of dental caries.

During the 1940s V.R. Bobyleva, L.A. Gorozhankina, E.V. Aleksandrova, N.P. Dzichkovskaya, N.V. Nikolaeva and I.I. Grachev carried out a large amount of experimental work on the etiology of dental caries under his leadership.

In 1949, after numerous experiments, Sharpenak proposed that dental caries was due to insufficient supply in the organs and tissues protein of B vitamins, and an excess of carbohydrates.

Publications
Some works of A.E. Sharpenak. 
Sharpenak A.E. Organic chemistry: a textbook for students of medical and dental institutions / ed. - 2nd, rev. and add. - M.: 1966. - 360 p. 
Sharpenak A.E., Kosenko S.A. Workshop on organic chemistry textbook for medical students / - Moscow, 1965. - 171 p. 
Sharpenak A.E.  Prophylaxis of dental caries. Rev Stomatol Chir Maxillofac. 1972 Dec;73(8):643-54. French. . PubMed - indexed for MEDLINE 
Sharpenak A.E., Bobyleva V.R., Gorozhankina L.A., Komnova Z.D. The role of protein and lysine in preventing dental caries. Vopr Pitan. 1971 Jul-Aug;30(4):3-7. Russian. .
Sharpenak A.E. The etiology and prevention of dental caries. N Y State Dent J. 1967 Dec;33(10):592-600. 
Sharpenak A.E. The problem of dental caries prevention. Vopr Med Khim. 1964 Nov-Dec;10:563-75. .
Sharpenak AE, Bobyleva VR, Gorozhankina LA. Role of protein, lysine, certain mineral substances and vitamins a and d in prevention of dental caries. Fed Proc Transl Suppl. 1964 Mar-Apr;23:423-6. .
Sharpenak A.E., Shishova O.A., Gorozhankina L.A. Effect of ionizing radiations in animals fed food containing various levels of histidine. Med Radiol (Mosk). 1959 Jun;4(6):37-41. .
Sharpenak AE. Quantitative human requirement for proteins and individual amino acids. Vopr Pitan. 1959 Jan-Feb;18(1):73-83. . 
Sharpenak A.E. Human requirement for individual amino acids. Vopr Pitan. 1957 Nov-Dec;16(6):9-17. .
Sharpenak A.E. Material for quantitative calculation of amino acid content of proteins in nutrition in normal and pathological conditions. Vopr Pitan. 1955 Sep-Oct;14(5):48-53. .

References

External links
Schatz A., Martin J.J., Schatz V. The implications of Soviet research on caries. An introduction to the work of Sharpenak. N Y State Dent J. 1967 Dec;33(10):587-91. .
Fitzpatrick, W. H. Soviet research in nutrition. Issue 4 of Monographs in Soviet medical sciences.  Institute of Contemporary Russian Studies, Fordham University, 1963 Original from the University of Michigan. Digitized 30 Jul 2008. -111 pages.
Rimington, C.  The Chemistry of the Proteins and Amino Acids. Annual Review of Biochemistry. Vol. 5: 117-158 (Volume publication date July 1936).  
Outstanding Scientists of Russia. Sharpenak Ernestovich Anatoly (1895-1969). Stomfak.ru - Dental Information Portal. Выдающиеся ученые России. Шарпенак Анатолий Эрнестович (1895-1969).  Stomfak.ru - Стоматологический информационный портал.
History of Medicine. Encyclopedia. Physicians. Sharpenak Anatoly Ernestovich. Department of the History of Medicine, Moscow State Medical and Dental University. История медицины. Энциклопедия. Медики. Шарпенак Анатолий Эрнестович. Кафедра истории медицины Московского государственного медико-стоматологического университета.
In memory of Anatolii Ernestovich Sharpenaka / / Nutrition. - 1969. March-28 April (2): 93.  Памяти Анатолия Эрнестовича Шарпенака // Вопросы питания. - 1969. Март-Апрель 28(2):93.
Site of Biological Chemistry Department, Moscow State Medical and Dental University. Сайт кафедры биологической химии Московский государственный медико-стоматологический университет|Московского государственного медико-стоматологического университета
Site of the Energy Metabolism Laboratory of the Institute of Nutrition. Сайт лаборатории обмена веществ и энергии Института питания РАМН
Site of the City Clinical Hospital named after S.P. Botkin. Сайт Городской клинической больницы имени С. П. Боткина.

Biochemists from the Russian Empire
1895 births
1969 deaths
Soviet biochemists
Full Members of the USSR Academy of Sciences
Academicians of the USSR Academy of Medical Sciences